Sound of Confusion is the first studio album by space rock group Spacemen 3, released in July 1986 on Glass Records. Four of the seven songs are cover versions; "Hey Man" combines the melody of Amen (gospel song) with the lyrics of Fixin' to Die Blues by Bukka White, "Rollercoaster", originally by the 13th Floor Elevators, "Mary Anne" (originally ″Just One Time″) by Juicy Lucy and "Little Doll" by The Stooges. The closing track "O.D. Catastrophe" clearly references the vocal melody of "T.V. Eye" by The Stooges, with an early version of the song even being titled "T.V. Catastrophe".

It was re-released in 1994 by Taang! including the three tracks on the Walkin' With Jesus EP and a demo of the song "2.35". It was re-released again in 1996 on Fire Records, who also re-released it as a vinyl LP in 2009.

Track listing
Original release (Glass GLALP 018)

1994 re-issue bonus tracks (Taang!)

Personnel
 Peter Kember - guitar, feedback
 Jason Pierce - guitar, vocals
 Pete Bain - bass
 Nicholas Brooker - drums, percussion

References

1986 debut albums
Spacemen 3 albums
Glass Records albums
Fire Records (UK) albums
Taang! Records albums